Virlovo is a rural locality (a village) in Kubenskoye Rural Settlement, Vologodsky District, Vologda Oblast, Russia. The population was 10 as of 2002.

Geography 
Virlovo is located 55 km northwest of Vologda (the district's administrative centre) by road. Yelyakovo is the nearest rural locality.

References 

Rural localities in Vologodsky District